Bourbon County (county code BB) is a county located in Southeast Kansas. As of the 2020 census, the county population was 14,360. Its county seat and most populous city is Fort Scott.

History

Early history

For many millennia, the Great Plains of North America was inhabited by nomadic Native Americans.  From the 16th century to 18th century, the Kingdom of France claimed ownership of large parts of North America.  In 1762, after the French and Indian War, France secretly ceded New France to Spain, per the Treaty of Fontainebleau.

19th century
In 1802, Spain returned most of the land to France, but keeping title to about 7,500 square miles.  In 1803, most of the land for modern day Kansas was acquired by the United States from France as part of the 828,000 square mile Louisiana Purchase for 2.83 cents per acre.

In 1854, the Kansas Territory was organized, then in 1861 Kansas became the 34th U.S. state.  In 1855, Bourbon County was established.

21st century
Bourbon virus, a new strain of thogotovirus, was first discovered in Bourbon County. In the spring of 2014 an otherwise healthy man was bitten by a tick, contracting the virus, dying 11 days later from organ failure.

Geography

Adjacent counties
 Linn County (north)
 Vernon County, Missouri (east)
 Crawford County (south)
 Neosho County (southwest)
 Allen County (west)
 Anderson County (northwest)

National protected area
 Fort Scott National Historic Site

Major highways
Sources:  National Atlas, U.S. Census Bureau
 U.S. Route 54
 U.S. Route 69
 Kansas Highway 3
 Kansas Highway 7
 Kansas Highway 31
 Kansas Highway 39
 Kansas Highway 65

Demographics

As of the 2000 census, there were 15,379 people, 6,161 households, and 4,127 families residing in the county.  The population density was 24 people per square mile (9/km2).  There were 7,135 housing units at an average density of 11 per square mile (4/km2).  The racial makeup of the county was 94.06% White, 3.08% Black or African American, 0.84% Native American, 0.36% Asian, 0.05% Pacific Islander, 0.28% from other races, and 1.33% from two or more races. Hispanic or Latino of any race were 1.29% of the population.

There were 6,161 households, out of which 30.50% had children under the age of 18 living with them, 54.50% were married couples living together, 9.20% had a female householder with no husband present, and 33.00% were non-families. 29.00% of all households were made up of individuals, and 14.90% had someone living alone who was 65 years of age or older.  The average household size was 2.44 and the average family size was 3.01.

In the county, the population was spread out, with 25.80% under the age of 18, 9.50% from 18 to 24, 24.20% from 25 to 44, 22.30% from 45 to 64, and 18.20% who were 65 years of age or older.  The median age was 38 years. For every 100 females there were 93.00 males.  For every 100 females age 18 and over, there were 88.50 males.

The median income for a household in the county was $31,199, and the median income for a family was $39,239. Males had a median income of $27,043 versus $20,983 for females. The per capita income for the county was $16,393.  About 9.50% of families and 13.50% of the population were below the poverty line, including 18.00% of those under age 18 and 13.40% of those age 65 or over.

Government

Presidential elections
Bourbon County is a strongly Republican county. Only six presidential elections from 1888 to the present have resulted in Republicans failing to win the county, with the last of these being in 1964.

Laws
Following amendment to the Kansas Constitution in 1986, the county remained a prohibition, or "dry", county until 1992, when voters approved the sale of alcoholic liquor by the individual drink with a 30% food sales requirement.

Education

Colleges
 Fort Scott Community College

Unified school districts
 Fort Scott USD 234
 Uniontown USD 235

Communities

Cities
 Bronson
 Fort Scott
 Fulton
 Mapleton
 Redfield
 Uniontown

Unincorporated communities

 Barnesville
 Berlin (no longer exists)
 Devon
 Garland
 Godfrey
 Hammond
 Harding
 Hiattville
 Hidden Valley
 Hollister (no longer exists)
 Marmaton
 Pawnee Station
 Ronald (Walkertown)
 Xenia
 Xerox

Townships
Bourbon County is divided into eleven townships.  The city of Fort Scott is considered governmentally independent and is excluded from the census figures for the townships.  In the following table, the population center is the largest city (or cities) included in that township's population total, if it is of a significant size.

Notable people
 Jonathan M. Davis, 22nd Governor of Kansas; born in Bourbon County.

See also
 National Register of Historic Places listings in Bourbon County, Kansas

References

Further reading

 Standard Atlas of Bourbon County, Kansas; Geo. A. Ogle & Co; 67 pages; 1920.
 History of Bourbon County, Kansas: To the Close of 1865; Thomas F. Robley; 269 pages; 1894.
 An Illustrated Historical Atlas of Bourbon County, Kansas; Edwards Brothers of Missouri; 55 pages; 1878.

External links

County
 
 Bourbon County - Directory of Public Officials
Maps
 Bourbon County Maps: Current, Historic, KDOT
 Kansas Highway Maps: Current, Historic, KDOT
 Kansas Railroad Maps: Current, 1996, 1915, KDOT and Kansas Historical Society

 
1855 establishments in Kansas Territory
Kansas counties
States and territories established in 1855